Thomas Porter Hawley (July 18, 1830 – October 7, 1907) was a justice of the Supreme Court of Nevada and a United States district judge of the United States District Court for the District of Nevada.

Education and career

Born in Milan, Indiana, Hawley read law to enter the bar in 1857. He was in private practice in Nevada City, California from 1858 to 1868, serving as a district attorney for Nevada County, California from 1863 to 1864. He relocated his private practice to Hamilton, Nevada from 1868 to 1870, and then to Eureka, Nevada until 1872. Hawley then served as a justice of the Supreme Court of Nevada from 1872 to 1890.

Federal judicial service

On August 30, 1890, Hawley was nominated by President Benjamin Harrison to a seat on the United States District Court for the District of Nevada vacated by Judge George Myron Sabin. Hawley was confirmed by the United States Senate on September 9, 1890, and received his commission the same day. Hawley retired from the bench on June 30, 1906. He died in San Francisco, California.

References

Sources
 

1830 births
1907 deaths
Justices of the Nevada Supreme Court
Judges of the United States District Court for the District of Nevada
United States federal judges appointed by Benjamin Harrison
19th-century American judges
United States federal judges admitted to the practice of law by reading law
People from Ripley County, Indiana
People from Nevada City, California
Chief Justices of the Nevada Supreme Court